The phylogenetic classification of bony fishes is a phylogenetic classification of bony fishes and is based on phylogenies inferred using molecular and genomic data for nearly 2000 fishes. The first version was published in 2013 and resolved 66 orders. The latest version (version 4) was published in 2017 and recognised 72 orders and 79 suborders.

Phylogeny 

The following cladograms show the phylogeny of the Osteichthyes down to order level, with the number of families in parentheses. 

The 43 orders of spiny-rayed fishes are related as follows:

References

External link
 www.deepfin.org - Phylogeny of all Fishes (redirects to https://sites.google.com/site/guilleorti/home)

Phylogenetics
Bony fish